In knot tying, a bight is a curved section or slack part between the two ends of a rope, string, or yarn.  A knot that can be tied using only the bight of a rope, without access to the ends, is described as in the bight.  The term "bight" is also used in a more specific way when describing Turk's head knots, indicating how many repetitions of braiding are made in the circuit of a given knot.

Bight vs. open loop
Sources differ on whether an open loop or U-shaped curve in a rope qualifies as a bight.   treats bights and loops as distinct, stating that a curve "no narrower than a semicircle" is a bight, while an open loop is a curve "narrower than a bight but with separated ends".  However, The Illustrated Encyclopedia of Knots (2002) states: "Any section of line that is bent into a U-shape is a bight."

Slipped knot

In order to make a slipped knot (also slipped loop and quick release knot),  a bight must be passed, rather than the end.  This slipped form of the knot is more easily untied.  The traditional bow knot used for tying shoelaces is simply a reef knot with the final overhand knot made with two bights instead of the ends.  Similarly, a slippery hitch is a slipped clove hitch.

In the bight
The phrase in the bight (or on a bight) means a bight of line is itself being used to make a knot.  Specifically this means that the knot can be formed without access to the ends of the rope.  This can be an important property for knots to be used in situations where the ends of the rope are inaccessible, such as forming a fixed loop in the middle of a long climbing rope.

Many knots normally tied with an end also have a form which is tied in the bight (for example, the bowline and the bowline on a bight).  In other cases, a knot being tied in the bight is a matter of the method of tying rather than a difference in the completed form of the knot.  For example, the clove hitch can be made "in the bight" if it is being slipped over the end of a post but not if being cast onto a closed ring, which requires access to an end of the rope.  Other knots, such as the overhand knot, cannot be tied in the bight without changing their final form.

Examples

References

Bibliography

External links

Knot components

fr:Nœud_(lien)#Ganses